Just Coolin' is the fourth album by the R&B group LeVert, released in 1988.

Production
The group wrote and produced the entire album, the first time they had done so.

Critical reception
The Rolling Stone Album Guide wrote that "the beats are bigger, the funk is deeper, and LeVert seems in the process of reinventing its whole sound." USA Today called the album the group's best to date, and praised the "delicious" ballads.

Track listing
"Pull Over" (Gerald Levert, Marc Gordon) 4:07
"Just Coolin'" (feat. Heavy D) - (Gerald LeVert, Marc Gordon)  4:19
"Gotta Get the Money" (Gerald LeVert, Marc Gordon) 4:45
"Take Your Time" (Gerald LeVert, Marc Gordon) 5:04
"Join in the Fun" (Gerald LeVert, Marc Gordon) 3:28
"Let's Get Romantic" (Gerald LeVert, Marc Gordon) 4:23
"Feel Real" (Gerald LeVert, Marc Gordon) 5:52
"Smilin'" (Gerald LeVert, Marc Gordon) 4:18
"Start Me up Again" (Gerald LeVert, Marc Gordon) 4:18
"Loveable" (Gerald LeVert, Marc Gordon) 5:23
"Addicted to You" (Gerald LeVert, Marc Gordon, Eddie LeVert Sr.) 3:52

Personnel
Gerald LeVert - Lead and Backing Vocals
Sean LeVert -  Backing Vocals
Marc Gordon - Keyboards, Backing Vocals
David Ervin - Drums, Keyboards
Gene Robinson, Johnny "T" Jones, Robert Cunningham, Norman Harris - Guitar 
Joel Davis, Odeen Mays, Jr., Craig Cooper, David Ervin - Keyboards
Mike Ferguson - Bass
Sam Peak - Saxophone
Jim Salamone - Percussion

Charts

Singles

References

External links
 

1988 albums
Albums produced by Gerald Levert
Atlantic Records albums
LeVert albums